A maple leaf is the leaf of the maple tree.

Maple leaf may also refer to:

Emblem of Canada
 Maple leaf, used as one of the national symbols of Canada
 Flag of Canada, which contains a red maple leaf
 Canadian Gold Maple Leaf, a gold bullion coin produced by the Royal Canadian Mint
 Canadian Silver Maple Leaf, a silver bullion coin produced by the Royal Canadian Mint

Commerce
 Maple Leaf Bar, a night club in New Orleans, US
 Maple Leaf Foods, a Canadian meat packer
 Maple Leaf, the first chewing gum producer in the Netherlands

Places
 Maple Leaf, Seattle, Washington, US
 Maple Leaf, South Dakota, US
 Maple Leaf, Toronto, Ontario, Canada

Transport
 Maple Leaf (WB-2), a world record setting Wright-Bellanca aircraft from the 1920s

Sailing
 Maple Leaf 48, a Canadian sailboat design
 Maple Leaf 54, a Canadian sailboat design
 Maple Leaf (schooner), a 92-foot sailing vessel built in 1904, operating as a small cruise ship touring the west coast of North America
 Maple Leaf (shipwreck), a historic shipwreck in Jacksonville, Florida, US

Trains
 Maple Leaf (train), a passenger service operated by Amtrak and Via Rail between New York City and Toronto
 Maple Leaf (GTW train), a passenger train service operated by the Grand Trunk Western Railroad between Chicago and Toronto
 Maple Leaf (LV train), a passenger train service operated by the Lehigh Valley Railroad and the Canadian National Railway between New York City and Toronto, and another section by the Reading Railroad originating in Philadelphia

Music
 Maple Leaf (album), a 2003 album by Valery Leontiev
 Maple Leaves (EP), a 2003 EP released by Jens Lekman
 "Maple Leaf Rag", a ragtime piece by Scott Joplin

Sport
 Notre-Dame-de-Grace Maple Leafs, a defunct Canadian junior football team

Ice hockey
 Toronto Maple Leafs, a National Hockey League team, based in Toronto, Ontario, Canada
 Lethbridge Maple Leafs, a men's senior ice hockey team
 St. John's Maple Leafs, an American Hockey League team, later relocated and renamed the Toronto Marlies
 Verdun Maple Leafs (ice hockey), a defunct Quebec Major Junior Hockey League team
 Victoria Maple Leafs, a Western Hockey League team

Baseball
 Toronto Maple Leafs (semi-pro baseball), an Intercounty Baseball League team
 Toronto Maple Leafs (International League), a former AAA minor league baseball team

Other uses
 Mapleleaf (freshwater mussel)